Mathias Nwafor Ugochukwu  (1926–1990) was a prominent Nigerian businessman from Anambra State. A leading industrialist from the Eastern Region of Nigeria, he played a pioneering role in large scale manufacturing in the region. He was sometimes called by his alias, Ugobuzuo. He was a friend to various Igbo politicians such as K. O. Mbadiwe and the former Nigerian Vice President, Alex Ekwueme. His relationship with the vice president may have led to his detention under the administration of General Buhari.

Life
Mathias Ugochukwu was born in Nsogwu, Umunze in the present Orumba South L.G.A of Anambra state. He attended St Augustine's Primary School, Umunze.  After completing his primary education, he left for Jos to work as a residential caretaker for Rufus "Ofor Jos" Ofor, an Igbo businessman from Enugwu-ukwu, Anambra State.  However, hoping for more opportunity, he left Jos and joined the police force in present-day Anambra State. Before joining the force, he was involved in minor trading. As an officer, he entered and won 50,000 pounds in the Irish Sweepstake. After collecting the sum, he found private enterprise more fulfilling and productive; he entered business full-time. As a businessman, he founded many firms, forming a strong conglomerate. He established a transport company, and formed a business venture with John Holt, later becoming the chairman of John Holt Inc. He also invested heavily in spare parts, textile importation and real estate development. As a leading Igbo businessman, he was the chairman of the board of directors of the African Development Corporation, the board also had C.T Onyekwelu and Louis Ojukwu as members. The company was part of a project to encourage African entrepreneurship and was supported by N.C.N.C.

In 1964, he was appointed chairman of the Nigerian Industrial Development Bank, becoming its first chairman.

During the 1970s, he bought various subsidiaries of John Holt as part of an Indigenization decree; he was one of the few Igbo businessmen with enough capital to acquire shares in the multi-national firms of Nigeria.

References

Tom G. Forrest, The advance of African capital: the growth of Nigerian private enterprise, International African Institute, Edinburgh University Press/University of Virginia Press, August 1994. 

Igbo businesspeople
1990 deaths
1926 births
Igbo people
People from Anambra State
People from Umunze
20th-century Nigerian businesspeople